The American Childhood Cancer Organization (ACCO), previously named Candlelighters Childhood Cancer Foundation, is a 501(c)(3) non-profit charitable organization dedicated to childhood cancer.

Today their membership of over 50,000 members of the national office and more than 100,000 members across the country, including ACCO affiliate groups, includes:

 Parents of children who are being treated or have been treated for cancer 
 Children with cancer
 Survivors of childhood cancer
 Immediate or extended family members 
 Bereaved families 
 Health care professionals 
 Educators

History
The organization was founded in Washington, D.C., in 1970 by parents of children and adolescents with childhood cancer to advocate for their needs, and to support research so every child survives and leads a long and healthy life. The Candlelighters name is derived from the proverb "It is better to light a candle than to curse the darkness." Two other Candlelighters organizations formed simultaneously in 1970, one in Florida, the other in California. The initial focus of the Washington D.C. group was legislative; to achieve congressional and administrative support for increased funding for childhood cancer research during the Nixon administration and the writing of the National Cancer Act.

Parent to parent contact had such a profound impact on the parents and families of children with cancer in the initial three groups that they decided to form a national organization. It was mutually agreed upon that the metropolitan Washington area group would assume the role of National Office of Candlelighters Childhood Cancer Foundation. From this initiative, local community organizations were established throughout the country. In 1976, the Candlelighters Foundation was incorporated as the communication link for groups and contacts throughout the country. In 1985, the name was officially changed to Candlelighters Childhood Cancer Foundation. In 1997, the National Office assisted one of the local Candlelighters organizations with the development and promotion of the gold ribbon symbol as the universal awareness symbol of childhood cancer. In 2001, the National Office released a new logo, one that embraced both symbols - the candle and the gold ribbon. In 2002 Candlelighters formed legal agreements with local organizations across the nation in a binding Affiliation Agreement regarding the use of the trademark name/logo and mission statement. In 2006, the national Candlelighters board voted to expand its mission and support innovative research initiatives.

Programs and services 

Distribute books free to families within the U.S. on the treatment and late effects of childhood cancer.
1-800 phone line for patient navigation services, for referrals to local Candlelighters organizations and for treatment/referral information.
On-line/email patient navigation information and referral services.
Comprehensive childhood cancer website, providing information on childhood cancer treatment and services.
Referral to Candlelighters Affiliates which (usually) provide peer support groups, in-hospital visits, and assistance programs for families of children with cancer.
Long term survivor information on the late effects of childhood cancer treatment.
Referral to Childhood Cancer Ombudsman Program for discrimination and health insurance problems (no website available).
Maintenance of an up-to-date list of oncology treatment centers and comprehensive late effects clinics and associated referrals.
Largest national childhood cancer awareness event, Light Up the Holidays with Hope, the National Childhood Cancer Awareness Tree held in Washington D.C. every December.
Referrals to wish foundations, oncology camps, and financial aid organizations.
Advocacy for childhood cancer patients, survivors and families within national and governmental committees including: C-Change ; FDA's Patient Consultant for Oncology Drug Development; FDA's Pediatric Subcommittee of ODAC; National Coalition for Cancer Research ; International Confederation of Childhood Cancer Parent Organizations ; American Cancer Society (Children and Cancer Advisory Group); Alliance for Childhood Cancer ; International Union Against Cancer .

External links
 American Childhood Cancer Organization

Charities based in Maryland
Cancer charities in the United States
Medical and health organizations based in Maryland